The Cape gerbil (Gerbilliscus afra) is a species of rodent found only in South Africa. Its natural habitats are subtropical or tropical dry shrubland and temperate desert.

References

Endemic fauna of South Africa
Gerbilliscus
Mammals of South Africa
Mammals described in 1830
Taxonomy articles created by Polbot